Raymond John Novotny Sr. (October 12, 1907 – May 30, 1995) was an American football player and coach.  He played professionally with the Portsmouth Spartans, Cleveland Indians and Brooklyn Dodgers of the National Football League (NFL). Prior to playing in the NFL, Novotny played college football at Ashland University. While at Ashland, he earned All-American honors in 1929. In 1934, he returned to Ashland to serve as the school's football coach. He also served as the baseball coach for the 1935 season.

His grandson is Maryland politician Reid Novotny.

Early life 
Novotny was born on October 12, 1907, in Cleveland to John Novotny and Caroline Hudec of Czech ancestry.

References

External links
 
 Kelley Loe - Wikipedia

1907 births
1995 deaths
American football fullbacks
American football halfbacks
American football quarterbacks
Ashland Eagles baseball coaches
Ashland Eagles baseball players
Ashland Eagles football coaches
Ashland Eagles football players
Ashland Eagles men's basketball coaches
Basketball coaches from Ohio
Brooklyn Dodgers (NFL) players
Cleveland Indians (NFL 1931) players
Kent State Golden Flashes football coaches
Portsmouth Spartans players
Sportspeople from Cleveland
Players of American football from Cleveland
American people of Czech descent